The story of the Princess Arab-Zandīq or The Story of ‘Arab-Zandīq (French: L'Histoire d'Arab-Zandyq) is a modern Egyptian folktale collected in the late 19th century by Guillaume Spitta Bey. It is related to the theme of the calumniated wife and classified in the international Aarne-Thompson-Uther Index as type ATU 707, "The Three Golden Children".

Summary
A king calls his vizier to join him in visiting the city at night. They see a light in the distance and approach it. Inside, three women talk to each other: the first promises to bake a large pancake for the king and his army; the second that she can weave a tent large enough to accommodate the king and his army; and the third promises to bear the king twins, a boy and a girl with alternate hairs of gold and hyacinth (gold and jasper, in a Hungarian translation), and their laughter will make the sun and the moon appear, and when they weep the skies shall thunder and rain. (In a translation by E. A. Wallis Budge, the third woman says her daughter will have golden hair and her son "hyacinthine locks").

The next day the king summons the three women and marries them. He sleeps with the first two on two separate nights, and they fail to deliver their promises. The third woman gives birth to a son and a daughter. The midwife is bribed by the other wives to replace the twins for two blind dogs and to cast them in a box into the river. The king sees the blind puppies and, feeling he was deceived, orders the woman to be tied to the stairs and covered with pitch, and for everyone to spit on her.

As for the twins, the box is saved by a fisherman who lives on an island. He and his wife raise the twins. Years pass, and one day, the fisherman takes the boy to the market to sell his fishes. The king passes by the market and sees the boy, named Muhammed. Sensing a strange connection to the boy, he pays the fishes and takes the boy with him to the palace. The king later sends the boy back to the fisherman. Meanwhile, the king's wife notices the boy is one of the children the midwife was supposed to kill. The midwife tells the king's wife not to worry, for she has a plan to get rid of the boy and his sister.

The midwife puts her plans into action: she goes to the fisherman's hut and finds the sister of the clever Muhammed (Muhammed the Discreet, in W. A. Clouston's translation) sitting alone. The woman goads the sister into sending Muhammed after the singing rose of a maiden named Arab-Zandiq. The boy rides until he reaches the house of an ogress, suckles her breasts and salutes her. The ogress tells him that his deed earned him her favour. After Muhammed talks about the singing rose, the ogress tells him about the garden where it is located: he is to exchange the fodder of a goat and a lion, then a gate will open, and he is to take the flower with him and flee before he becomes stone.

It happens as the ogress describes. Muhammed takes the rose back to his sister. Some time later, he visits the king again, and the midwife returns to the fisherman's hut: the rose will not sing unless the mirror is near it. The girl sends her brother to get the mirror. Muhammed goes back to he ogress, who this time advises him to go beyond the garden, up a staircase and find the mirror in a room.

The boy brings back the mirror. The midwife returns to the fisherman's hut and convinces the sister to ask for Arab-Zandiq herself. Muhammed goes back to the ogress, who warns him that many have tried to get her and failed, doomed to be turned into stone by her powers. Muhammed rides his horse to Arab-Zandiq's palace, puts his horse's head against a wall of the palace and shouts at the maiden's window for her to appear. Arab-Zandiq, from her window, tries to shoo away the boy, and the horse and him are slowly transformed into stone. The third time, Arab-Zandiq leans out of the window, her hair reaching the ground. Muhammed seizes the opportunity to pull her out of the window by her hair. Defeated, the maiden tells the boy she is destined for him, and disenchants the many stones in her palace.

Muhammed brings Arab-Zandiq with him to his sister. Arab-Zandiq orders her servants to build a palace in the fisherman's island, and tells Muhammed to invite the king to their new palace for his wedding with Arab-Zandiq. The king becomes impressed with the boy's palace and invites the boy, his wife and his sister to the royal palace.

So the three go to the royal palace. Arab-Zandiq sees the poor woman shackled to the stairs and covers her with a shawl. The king's servants take notice of this act of kindness and question the guest. Arab-Zandiq orders them to take the woman, bathe and cleanse her, and to provide her with new clothes. During the banquet with the king, the fisherman reveals he found the box with the twins in the river and raised the two. The twins' mother, brought to the banquet, recognizes her children by their hairs of hyacinth and gold. The king still wants them to prove their relationship, so they weep and thunders roar and it rains; they laugh, and the sun and the moon appear. The king celebrates that his family is reunited and burns his wife and the midwife.

Analysis

Tale type
The tale is classified in the international Aarne-Thompson-Uther Index as type ATU 707, "The Three Golden Children", a tale type that, according to scholars Ibrahim Muhawi and Sharif Kanaana, is very popular in the Arab world.

In a late-19th century study, scholar W. A. Clouston listed L'Histoire d'Arab-Zandik as the "Modern Arabic" version of The Sisters Envious of Their Cadette, from the compilation The Arabian Nights. French comparativist Emmanuel Cosquin also related the Egyptian tale to a French story about a calumniated wife, her children of wondrous aspect and a quest for magical objects.

Motifs
French ethnologist , in regards to a Kabylian variant, noted that the sisters' jealousy originated from their perceived infertility, and that their promises of grand feats of domestic chores were a matter of "capital importance" to them.

Hasan El-Shamy remarked that in Middle Eastern tales the royal children, born of the third sister, are a brother-sister twin pair.

W. A. Clouston noted that the fairy Arab-Zandyk replaces the Speaking Bird of the other variants of type 707 in revealing the truth to the king.

Philologist Johannes Østrup ascribed an "Oriental" origin to the motif of the monarch banning lighting candles at night, which appears in many of the variants.

Another motif that appears in these variants is the hero suckling an ogress's breastmilk during the quest for the objects.

Variants

North Africa
Author E. M Chadli listed variants found in the Maghreb region: L'uccelo della verità ("The Bird of Truth"), by Destaing; "Il figlio e la figlia del re" ("The King's Son and Daughter"), by Biarnay; La storia di Zaohuet ed-Denia ("The Story of Zaohuet ed-Denia"), by Huet; La storia della tre sorelle ("The tale of the three sisters"), by Legey; L'ucello del paese dell'aratura ("The Bird from the Plowing Country"), by Pellar; Storie di tre donne ("Tale of three girls"), by Lacoste-Dujardin; and Il principe e la principessa alle fonti d'oro e l'universo, by Khatibi.

Egypt
El-Shamy mentioned that 14 variants of the tale type exist in the Egyptian archives (as of the 1980s).

In the tale The Nightingale that Shrieked, collected by Inea Bushnaq, the youngest sister promises twins: "a boy with locks of gold and silver" and a girl who can make the sun shine with her smile and rain fall with her weeping. Years later, they are sent on a quest for the Tree with Apples that dance and Apricots that sing and the Bulbul Assiah, the Nightingale that Shrieks, both tasks completed only by the brother.

In a tale El-Shamy collected from a female teller in a village in the Nile Delta and published with the title The Promises of the Three Sisters, a king forces a ban on lighting candles at night. He goes with his vizier to check on the people and sees an illuminated house. Inside, three sisters are weaving and talking: the eldest promises to bake a cake to feed the king and his army; the second that she will weave a carpet to sit the entire army; and the third that she will bear twins, a boy named Clever Muhammed and a girl called Sitt el-Husn ("Mistress of Beauty"), both with golden and silver hair. Years later, the twins quest for the "dancing bamboo, singing water and talking lark". Clever Muhammed, the brother, obtains the first two items, but fails in the third quest. The sister saves him and gets the bird.

In a tale collected by Yacoub Artin Pacha in the Nile Valley with the title El-Schater Mouhammed, a king forbids lighting candles at night. Three sisters, daughters of a bean seller, disobey the ban and  light a candle one night. The king goes to the city with his vizier and dervishes to enforce the ban, and see the three sisters' house. They overhear their convesation: the elder wants to marry the king and promises to spread silk from their house to the palace; the second claims she can bake a cake grand enough for him and the people; the youngest promises to give birth to twins, a boy and a girl, the boy having hair of gold and silver and, when he cries, the sky will be clouded, it will be cold and rainy, and when he laughs, the skies will be clear, even in winter. Years later, the midwife tricks the king that the twins, the boy named El-Chater Mouhammed and the girl Sit-el-Hôsn oual Gamal, intent to dethrone the king, and suggests to give the twins the quest for the objects: the Tree of Sitti-Han (El-Chater obtains the tree and marries its owner, a maiden named Sitti-Han) and "a baby or infant who can speak eloquently".

Tunisia
In a Tunisian version collected from teller Lela Ula with the title En busca del pájaro esmeralda ("The quest for the emerald bird"), a sultan wears a disguise to spy on his subjects at night and forbids to light any candle at night. One night, however, three sisters disobey his ban and begin to spin and weave. The sultan comes to their house and listens to their conversation: the eldest claims to be able to cook a soup like the sultan has never tasted; the middle one that she can prepare a delicious ftat, and the youngest that she will bear the sultan three children, two boys with silver hair and a girl with golden hair. The sultan marries each of the sisters, hoping that they will prove their claims. The elder two fail and are locked in the attic, while the youngest gives birth to the three children, but the midwife replaces the children for little animals and takes them with her. The children grow up and meet the king, to the sisters' horror. To assuage their fears, an evil old woman named Asuset essetút visits the siblings' house and convinces them to seek the ettufáh el-li ifúh / wi irud errúh lirrúh ("perfumed apples that restore the soul"), and the emerald bird that sings. The emerald bird reveals the truth in a banquet with the sultan.

In a Tunisian tale translated into Russian as "Смертельная зависть" ("Mortal Jealousy"), three sisters tell one another their dreams about future husbands: the elder to the royal cook, the middle one to the chamberlain, and the youngest to the king himself, and she will bear him a son and a daughter. The king overhears their conversation and brings them to the palace to fulfill their dreams. Envying their cadette's fortunate marriage, the elder sisters take the boy and the daughter as soon as they are born (in consecutive pregnancies), replace them for a kitten and a monkey, and cast in the water. The babies are found by a hunter and, years later, are sent for a singing bird. The brother fails and is turned to stone; the sister prevails, rescues him and gets the bird.

In a Tunisian tale titled M'hammed, le fils du sultan ("M'hammed, the son of the Sultan"), a sultan moves away from his family to another city. Six of his seven sons tell their mother they wish to pay a visit to their father, joined by their father's valet Saâd. The six princes each take an individual journey to their father's city and, seeing coins and dinars on the ground, each of them fetches them and puts a heap on a basket as a gift to their father. The sultan reacts badly to the presents and locks each of his sons in the dungeons. The titular M'hammed, le fils du sultan, the youngest son, decides to take a similar journey, despite his mother's pleas. He is joined by Saâd; they pass by a kingdom with gold coins lying on the ground and another of gems and diamonds. M'hammed then goes fishing until he empties the sea of the every fish, and a last fish appears to beg him to stop. M'hammed questions the fish about it, and the animal tells it was M'hammed's father's previous wife, changed into a fish by God, and gives him a necklace as proof of her words. M'hammed takes the necklace and goes to his father's city. The boy gives his father the necklace, and the sultan decides to name M'hammed as his successor, but he warns him against freeing his six elder brothers. Time passes, and M'hammed, hearing his mother's pleas, decides to release his brothers, who become angry that their cadet will rule over them. Later, M'hammed takes Saâd with him to the land of ogres, Saâd kills an ogre and takes a palace for his master. M'hammed sends a carrier pigeon to his father, the sultan, and asks him what he can find for his palace. The sultan, spurred by a vizier, tells M'hammed about the fragrant apples that restore the spirit and the soul, the singing bird with a talking wing; the blood of gazelles that waters the apples and on which the singing bird feeds; and a maiden named Flifla, the daughter of the king of the jinns.

Algeria
In a tale from Kabylie, La fille du forgeron ("The Blacksmith's Daughter"), a sultan has two barren co-wives. One day, he visits a village. There, three girls are talking among themselves: the first, the daughter of the woodsman, says she can make a whole plate of couscous with only a grain of wheat; the second, the daughter of the carpenter, says she can make a beautiful burnous with only a tuft of wool; the third, the titular daughter of the blacksmith, says if she marries the sultan, she will give birth to a son with a temple of gold and the other of silver; another son with teeth of pearls and diamonds and a girl more beautiful than the sun. This tale was collected by writer Rabam Belamri from his aunt in Bougaa, near Kabylie.

Two versions have been recorded by German ethnographer Leo Frobenius in his Atlantis book collection. In the first tale, Die ausgesetzten Geschwister ("The abandoned sisters"), seven sisters go to fetch wood. The youngest feels a bit tired and rests beneath a tree with two other sisters. While they are resting, one young "Agelith" passes by and the sisters announce their promises: the elder that she will feed many people with a handful of wheat; the second that she can feed an entire city with a sheepskin; the third that she will bear him a son with a silver stars and silver moon in his hair, and a girl with a golden sun on the front. They are found by a fisherman and live in their hut. Years pass, and the aunts' accomplice, an old witch, convinces them to search for the Tär Lemeghani ("The Singing Bird") and water from the fountain located where the rocks collide. The brother also rescues several petrified people in the area. In the second, Die goldhaarigen Kinder ("The Golden-Haired Children"), which was identified by Frobenius as a variant of the former, the youngest sister promises to give birth to twin boys with golden hair on the front (taunsa-ne-d'hav). Both variants were later identified as Kabylian.

In an Algerian variant collected in Blida by Joseph Desparmet from informant Fatma bent Eldjennâdî, titled La Ghoule Secourable, a king announces his plans to marry, and orders every possible maiden to pass by his window. One day, three girls pass under the king's window: the first promises to feed the king's troops with just a plate of couscous, the second that she can weave garments for the whole troop with wool from a single fleece, and the third that the will bear the king a girl and a boy, both with golden and silver hair. The king marries the first girl and, when she fails on her promise, he divorces her. The same happens to the second girl. He lastly marries the third one, to the envy of the other two. The jealous women seek the services of a Settout (an evil old woman), to act as the queen's midwife. The Settout replaces the queen's first child, a boy, for a puppy and casts him in a box in the river. The same happens with the second child, a girl. They are saved and raised by a fisherman and his wife. Some years later, the fisherman's own children mock the boy and the girl and they leave home. They buy a house and the brother meets the king. The jealous women tell the Settout, who visits the sister while her brother is away. The Settout tells her first about the Les Pommes de Senteur et L’Eau qui rend la vie (Algerian: Etteffâḥ ennifouḥ ou elmâ llî irodd errouḥ, English: “Scented Apples and Water of Life”); then about Le Basilic qui claque et L’eau qui ulule (Algerian: Elḥbeq elli iseffeq ou el mâ llî iouelouel; English: “The Basil that claps and Ululating Water”). When the brother brings the basil and the ululating water, they do not move at all, which the Settout attributes to the absence of their master, L’Aigle Vert (“The Green Eagle”), a little bird in a cage. Lastly, the Settout tells them about the owner of the Green Eagle, a beautiful maiden named Lalla Loundja. With the help of a Ghoule, the brother gets all items to his sister. At the end of the tale, Lalla Loundja marries the brother, and suggests the siblings invite the king and his viziers to a banquet, during which she reveals the truth and reunites the family. French ethnologist , in her study about the Kabylian oral repertoire, listed La Ghoule Secourable as a Kabylian variant of type 707.

In a variant from Beni Snous collected by E. Destaing from informant Si El-Haoussin Ben El-Hadj Ennacer and translated as Le fils et la fille du roi ("The Son and The Daughter of the King"), a king and his ministers go with some troops to a mountain. When they rest and drink a bit of water, three girls come by the fountain and talk to one another what they can do if the sultan marries one of them: the first promises to feed the troops with a single grain; the second that she can weave garments for the whole troop with a single fleece; and the third that she can bear the sultan twins, a boy and a girl with "golden and silver horns". The sultan asks his minister to bring the first girl (the pacha's daughter) to prove her skills; she fails and is sent back to her father. He then summons the judge's daughter (the second girl) to test her weaving skills; she also fails. He then summons the third girl and marries her, to the jealousy of the sultan's other wives. The sultan's co-wives hire the Settout to replace the children for animals and to cast them in the water. The twins are saved by a fisherman named Mohammed. Years later, the boy, now called Mhammed, meets with the sultan at a café. The sultan's co-wives ask Settout to get rid of the boy. The old woman sends him on three quests: firstly, for the singing bird; secondly, for a steed named Baberkat; lastly, for a maiden named Zohra bent Zehour. Zohra bent Zehour marries Mhammed and suggests her husband and his sister invite the sultan for a banquet. During the banquet, Zohra bent Zahour tells their story and shows the sultan the twins' horns of gold and silver. Destaing identified this tale as a variant of the Arabian Nights tale "Histoire de Les Deux Soeurs Jalouses de leur Cadette", which was confirmed by Camille Lacoste-Dujardin as belonging to tale type 707.

French orientlist  collected and published a Berber language variant from Ouargla with the title Tanfoust n Zahouet eddenia: the king's mother takes her grandchildren and casts them in the water, but they are saved by a fisherman. An old lady goes to the twins' house and convinces the girl to seek the water from between the stones, the pomegranate of the pomegranate trees and l’halib lboui (a curdled milk from the stomach of a young ogre). Lastly, the old lady convinces her to send her brother for a maiden named Zahouet Eddenia, a prisoner guarded by an army of scorpions, scarabs and serpents, and by her brother, a bird that petrifies people with his breath. The male twin is petrified by the bird, but his sister goes after him and defeats the bird. Zahouet Eddenia is rescued by the male twin and brought with them. This tale is also a variant of tale type 707.

French missionary Joseph Rivière collected a Kabylian variant from Djurdjura with the title Les enfants et la chauve-souris ("The Children and the Bat"): a man has two wives, the first is barren, while the younger gives birth to eight children in succession. Each time, the first wife takes a child and abandons them in the forest. The story tells that God rescues the children and the youngest sister prepares the food for her brothers. One day, an old woman comes to their house and tells the girl that her brothers can get her a bat if they love her. Each of the seven brothers fail in getting the bat, for the animal uses its magical powers to turn their guns into pieces of wood and to reduce their sizes. The girl captures the bat and restores her brothers to normal, as soon as the bat makes her promise to dress it in gold and silver. The bat leads the eight children to their father's house, but the father's second wife poisons the food. The bat warns them to avoid eating whatever the animals will eat. The animals eat a poisoned couscous and die. The sister prepares the food for her brothers. The bat touches the eyes of the children and the eight siblings recognize their parents. The first is punished. In a late-19th century study, scholar W. A. Clouston related this tale to other variants of The Sisters Envious of Their Cadette, from the compilation The Arabian Nights. Lacoste-Dujardin also grouped this tale with other North African variants of type ATU 707.

Morocco
In a variant titled ṭ-ṭăyʁ l-mḥăddəθ ("The Talking Bird"), collected in Chefchaouen, Morocco, by researcher Aicha Ramouni from teller Lālla Ḥusniyya l-ʕAlami, the third sister promises to give birth to twins, a boy and a girl who can make the sun appear with their smiles and rain fall with their tears, and leave one brick of gold and other of silver whenever they walk. Their adoptive father is the one to give them the first items the old woman asks for; but the last item, the talking bird, is sought by the brother, who fails, and obtained by the sister.

In a variant from Marrakech collected by Dr. Françoise Légey with the title Ṭîr El-Gabouri or L'oiseau du pays de Gabour ("The Bird from the Land of Gabour"), four women talk in the woods in front of the king's garden: the first promises to feed his troops with only a plate of couscous, the second that she can sate the thirst of the troops with only a bucket of water, the third that she can weave head coverings for the troops with the hair of one horse only, and the fourth that she can bear the king a boy with a lock of silver and a girl with tresses of gold. The king summons all four women for them to display their talents: the first three women deliver on their promises, but are relegated to the king's harem, while he marries the fourth woman. The midwife takes the twins as soon as they are born and casts them in the water, and replaces them for puppies. They are saved and raised by a fisherman and his wife. Years later, after their adoptive parents die, while going to the mosque, the girl is approached by an old woman, who insists to be her servant. She is brought to their palace, and she tells the girl the palace is beautiful, but lacks several items: on the first quest, the old woman tells about two jets of water, water of roses and water from orange blossoms; on the second quest, the water that "youyoute" ("makes sounds of joy"); on the third quest, the laughing pomegrante; on the fourth quest, the dancing reed. The brother simply delivers the items to the sister. Later, the old woman tells them about the Ṭîr El-Gabouri, a bird from the land of Gabour, which can sing in their garden. The brother goes to the ends of the Earth and meets a Ghoul, who directs him to the bird. The brother fails and is petrified; the sister follows him, catches the bird and disenchants her brother and several others that were petrified by the bird. Lastly, the same old woman tells them to invite the king to their garden. The bird Ṭîr El-Gabouri reveals the truth to the king in the siblings' garden. French ethnologist Camille Lacoste-Dujardin, in her study about the Kabylian oral repertoire, listed L'oiseau des pays de labour (sic) as a Moroccan variant of type 707.

In a variant from Morocco titled L'Oiseau Conteur, a local king is married to two co-wives, but has not fathered a son yet. A tribe gives him a young woman to marry and she becomes pregnant. Every time a child is born to her (two boys and a girl, in three consecutive pregnancies), the co-wives replace them for puppies and cast them in the river. Seeing that the boys and the girl are becoming fine and brave warriors, the king's jealous vizir advises the king to send the fisherman'a children to seek the Oiseau Conteur ("The [Story]telling Bird"). The two elder brothers fail in getting the bird, and are dragged below the earth; the sister traps the bird inside a cage and forces the bird to restore her brothers. The bird is then brought to the king's presence and tells them the fisherman's children are truly his children.

Reginetta Haboucha summarized two variants collected from Tétouan. In the first, Las hermanas envidiosas ("The Jealous Sisters"), the children (two brothers and one sister, in consecutive births) are sent for the Silver Water, the Talking Bird and the Singing Tree. In the second, El agua verde, la caña que tañe y el pájaro que canta, the children (two sons and a daughter), each with a gold star on the front, are born in consecutive years, and when older, are sent for the "Green Water Fish", a Cane/Reed, and the Bird that Sings.

Tell Atlas
In a variant collected in the Tell Atlas area from an informant from Tafoughalt, titled Los hermanos de los mechones de oro ("The Brothers with Golden Locks"), a rich man listens to three women talking near the fountain: the first wants to marry him and promises to weave a burnoose with the wool of a single sheep; the second claims she can prepare a meal for the whole village with a single sheep's thigh, and the third promises to bear him twins with golden locks. The man marries all three women; the first two fail in their boasts and the third gives birth to twins, a girl and a boy. The other two take the twins and abandon them in the woods. An old woman passes by the woods and rescues the twins. They grow up and the male twin marries a woman, while the female twin spends her days at home. The jealous women send an old lady to the twins' house to convince them to seek the milk of a lioness, brought in the hide of its cub; the water that flows where the mountains meet; and the singing bird from the golden house of the tejniud (a fairy woman).

References

African fairy tales
Berber culture
Egyptian fairy tales
Female characters in fairy tales
Fictional kings
Fictional queens
Twins in fiction
Fictional twins
Child abandonment
Adoption forms and related practices
Adoption, fostering, orphan care and displacement
ATU 700-749